The Kegite Club formerly known as Palm Wine Drinkers Association is a soci-cultural group in Nigeria headquartered in Obafemi Awolowo University, Ile-ife, Osun State, Nigeria,  founded in 1962.

Notes

References 

Organizations established in 1962
1962 establishments in Nigeria
Cultural organizations based in Nigeria